Farrington Lake is a scenic freshwater reservoir in Middlesex County, New Jersey near Milltown, New Jersey. Created by a dam on the Lawrence Brook, a tributary of the Raritan River, the lake is in fact a widened section of the Lawrence Brook. Its main tributaries are the  Ireland Brook, the Beaverdam Brook, and the Oakeys Brook.

The lake is named after Edward Farrington, mayor of New Brunswick, New Jersey, in 1915–1918, who envisioned the construction of the dam to supply water to his city. Mayor Farrington died while in office, in 1918.

The lake is bordered by East Brunswick, North Brunswick and South Brunswick. The lake is accessible from a boat ramp; the only powered boats allowed are those with an electric motor.

Fish species in the lake include Chain Pickerel, Channel Catfish, Largemouth Bass,  Northern Pike, Crappie, Brown Trout, Yellow Perch and Rainbow Trout.

References

External links
The Scenic Lawrence Brook (pictures)
Lawrence Brook Watershed Partnership - LBWP (watershed association)

Bodies of water of Middlesex County, New Jersey
Raritan River
Reservoirs in New Jersey